South Carolina Highway 47 (SC 47) is a  primary state highway in the U.S. state of South Carolina. It serves to connect the town of Elloree with U.S. Route 301 (US 301).

Route description
SC 47 is a two-lane rural highway that connects the town of Elloree at SC 6/SC 267 southwest to US 301 located at Goodbys Swamp.  The predominant features along the route is farmland; in Elloree, the downtown area the road is divided with parking on driver's right-side.

History
Established in 1930 as a new primary routing, connecting SC 4 (currently US 301) and SC 45 (currently SC 6/SC 267); it is also the second SC 47.  The entire highway was paved by 1938.  In 1940, SC 47 was extended north, in concurrency with SC 6, to Lone Star, then northwest to SC 26 (currently US 601) near Singleton.  In 1948 it was reverted to its original and current routing, leaving behind Lone Star Road (S-9-11).

The first SC 47 was an original state highway (1922) that traversed from SC 40 in Green Sea, northwest through Nichols and Lake View, before entering North Carolina.  By 1926 was renumbered to SC 94.

Major intersections

Special routes

Elloree truck route

South Carolina Highway 47 Truck (SC 47 Truck) is a  truck route of SC 47 that exists mostly within the city limits of Elloree. It begins on Felderville Road (S-38-81) then onto Snider Street (S-38-1023); at Main Street, it goes back northwest, in concurrency with SC 6/SC 267, reuniting with SC 47 at its northern terminus. The portion on Felderville Road and Snider Street is also SC 6 Truck. A Food Lion distribution center is located in the town, the truck route provides an alternate route to that center.

See also

References

External links

 
 SC 47 at Virginia Highways' South Carolina Highways Annex

047
Transportation in Orangeburg County, South Carolina